The 1930 Australian Championships was a tennis tournament that took place on outdoor Grass courts at the Kooyong Stadium in Melbourne, Australia from 18 January to 27 January. It was the 23rd edition of the Australian Championships (now known as the Australian Open), the 6th held in Melbourne, and the first Grand Slam tournament of the year. Australians Gar Moon and Daphne Akhurst won the singles titles.

Finals

Men's singles

 Gar Moon defeated  Harry Hopman  6–3, 6–1, 6–3

Women's singles

 Daphne Akhurst defeated  Sylvia Harper  10–8, 2–6, 7–5

Men's doubles

 Jack Crawford /  Harry Hopman defeated  Tim Fitchett /  Jack Hawkes 8–6, 6–1, 2–6, 6–3

Women's doubles

 Emily Hood /  Mall Molesworth defeated  Marjorie Cox /  Sylvia Harper 6–3, 0–6, 7–5

Mixed doubles

 Nell Hall /  Harry Hopman defeated  Marjorie Cox /  Jack Crawford 11–9, 3–6, 6–3

External links
 Australian Open official website

1930
1930 in Australian tennis
January 1930 sports events